James Thynne (1644–1709) was the member of Parliament for the constituency of Cirencester for the parliament of January 1701.

References 

Members of Parliament for Cirencester
English MPs 1701
1644 births
1709 deaths